Rossant is a surname of English, Welsh, and French origins. 

Notable people with the surname include:

 Cecile Rossant (born 1961), American writer
 Colette Rossant (born 1932), French-American food writer
 James Rossant (1928–2009), American architect, urban designer, and artist
 Janet Rossant (born 1950), British developmental biologist
 Lorrie Rossant, 20th Century British architect and co-founder of the Building Design Partnership
 Murray Rossant (1925–1988), American journalist, head of The Century Foundation
 Tomas Rossant (born 1965), American architect

See also
 Pallache (surname)
 Pallache family

References

External links
 Internet Surname Databse